Alexandros Nikolopoulos (born 20 October 1970) is a Greek modern pentathlete. He competed at the 1992 Summer Olympics.

References

External links
 

1970 births
Living people
Greek male modern pentathletes
Olympic modern pentathletes of Greece
Modern pentathletes at the 1992 Summer Olympics
Sportspeople from Athens
Swimmers from Athens
Athletes from Athens